The Archaeological Museum of Olympia (Greek: Αρχαιολογικό Μουσείο Ολυμπίας) is one of the principal museums of Greece, located in Olympia. It is overseen by the Ministry of Culture and Sports, and, as of 2009, is directed by Georgia Xatzi. When the original building was completed and opened in 1882, it was the first museum in Greece outside of Athens.

The museum houses discoveries from the surrounding area, including the site of the Ancient Olympic Games. The collection includes objects produced and used in the area from prehistory to its time under Roman rule. The principal pieces in the museum are Hermes and the Infant Dionysus (attributed to Praxiteles), some objects from the Temple of Zeus, the Nike of Paionios, as well as an oenochoe that belonged to Phidias. The extent of its bronze collection makes it one of the most important in the world. 

Today, the museum is housed in two buildings: the principal building with twelve rooms for exhibitions, organized both around themes and ages of the objects. The other building is dedicated to the museum store, and is separate from the main structure, located on the path to the archaeological site.

History of the museum 
Excavation work at Altis in the 19th century quickly necessitated the construction of a building to display uncovered objects and works of art. The banker Andreas Syngros paid 220,000 drachmas to fund the construction and entrusted the design and building of the museum to two German architects and archaeologists who had begun the excavation on the site. Wilhelm Dorpfeld and Friedrich Adler, the architects, oversaw the construction of a neo-classical building which was erected on the hill of Drouva near the way out of Olympie toward the sanctuary. Finished in 1888, it was the first Greek museum built outside of Athens. It was damaged in 1954 by an earthquake, and later proved ultimately too small to house and display the museum’s expanding collections. Plans to build a new museum were approved in the 1970s. Although it was unused for some time, the original building was re-purposed and since 2004 has been a museum about the history of the original Olympic games.

Collections 

 Collection of terracottas (prehistoric, Archaic and Classical periods).
 Collection of bronzes.
 Collection of sculptures (Archaic up to the Roman periods).
 Collection from the Olympic Games.

Notable holdings and exhibits
 The Hermes and the Infant Dionysus by Praxiteles (possibly)
 The Nike of Paionios
 The Winged Gorgoneion
 Zeus carrying Ganymedes
 Pediments of the Temple of Zeus
 The helmet of Miltiades
 Miniature bronze statue of a horse

The statue of Apollo from the west pediment of the Temple of Zeus was depicted on the obverse of the Greek 1000 drachmas banknote of 1987-2001.

Gallery

See also 
 Ancient Olympia
 Ancient Olympic Games
 List of museums in Greece
 Praxiteles
 Statue of Zeus at Olympia

References

External links

Hellenic Ministry of Culture and Tourism
 Hellenic Ministry of Foreign Affairs
Archaeological Museum of Olympia - Ebook by Latsis Foundation
www.planetware.com

Olympia
Olympia, Greece
Museums established in 1982
1982 establishments in Greece
Buildings and structures in Elis
Olympia